Rhosrobin Halt was a minor railway station located on the Great Western Railway's Paddington to Birkenhead line a few miles north of Wrexham in Wales. Only local trains called here and freight was never handled at the station. The route is still open today as part of the Shrewsbury to Chester Line. The station was located just north of Wheatsheaf Junction, where the goods line from Cefn-y-Bedd joined on the north side of the line. The double track on the Wrexham to Chester section was singled in the 1980s but has been re-doubled in part since, with work completed in April 2017.

Neighbouring stations

References

Further reading

External links
 Rhosrobin Halt on navigable 1946 O.S. map

Disused railway stations in Wrexham County Borough
Former Great Western Railway stations
Railway stations in Great Britain opened in 1932
Railway stations in Great Britain closed in 1947